Austin Police Department (APD) is the principal law enforcement agency serving Austin, Texas. As of Fiscal Year 2022, the agency had an annual budget of $443.1 million and employed around 2,484 personnel, including approximately 1,809 officers. The department also employs 24 K-9 police dogs and 16 horses. Joseph Chacon was confirmed as Austin's new interim police chief effective April 11, 2021. Chacon was named permanent Chief of Police in October 2021.

Specialized units

Patrol divisions

Ranks

Fallen officers
Since the establishment of the Austin Police Department, twenty-three officers have died in the line of duty.

Controversial killings 

In 2003, an officer attempted to handcuff a suspect through a car window, and shot the suspect to death when the suspect accelerated. The officer received a 90-day suspension for failure to follow high-risk traffic stop protocol. In 2009, an armed suspect was shot during a struggle with an officer. An investigation concluded that the officer used excessive force and acted recklessly. The officer was suspended 15 days for failure to activate his patrol car camera.

Sidearms

As of 2012, APD officers are currently issued the Smith & Wesson M&P40 pistol. Officers may carry any department approved firearm as their secondary weapon.

Gallary

See also 
Law enforcement in the United States

References

External links

Police
Municipal police departments of Texas